The 2010 Chick-fil-A Bowl was a college football bowl game played at the Georgia Dome in Atlanta, Georgia, on December 31, 2010, with kickoff at 7:30 p.m. EST. With sponsorship from Chick-fil-A, it was the 43rd edition of the game known throughout most of its history as the Peach Bowl. The game  featured the No. 19 South Carolina Gamecocks versus the No. 23 Florida State Seminoles.

Teams

South Carolina

The SEC Eastern Division Champion South Carolina Gamecocks appeared in the Chick-fil-A Bowl. The Gamecocks also entered the game with an impressive 9–4 record after a 7–6 season in 2009. South Carolina has some of the finest young talent in the SEC in freshman running back Marcus Lattimore and sophomore receiver Alshon Jeffery. They also made their first appearance in the Chick-fil-A Bowl, although they do have one Peach Bowl appearance: a 14–3 loss to West Virginia in 1969.

Florida State

The ACC Atlantic Division Champion Florida State Seminoles came into the game with a 9–4 record in coach Jimbo Fisher's first season. The strength of the Seminoles this season has been their defense, which ranks No. 2 in the nation in sacks and No. 17 in tackles for loss. Florida State's appearance in the Chick-fil-A Bowl marks a continuance of their streak of active consecutive bowl games to twenty nine. Although FSU has never appeared in the Chick-fil-A Bowl under its current name, it has appeared in two games when it was known as the Peach Bowl, losing the inaugural game in 1968 and winning it in 1983.

Like South Carolina, Florida State has been a member of its current conference since 1992.

Game summary

Scoring summary

Statistics

Game Notes

Florida State QB Christian Ponder had left the game in the second quarter with a concussion, E.J Manuel had taken over the Florida State offense. E.J completed 11 to 15 passes for 84 yards and a touchdown and had seven carries for 46 yards. He was 7-for-7 passing on the fourth-quarter touchdown drive led the Seminoles to 26–17 win. After the game Florida State Coach Jimbo Fisher said "I hate it for Christian, he got dinged on the back of his head. He came off and he was kind of out of it a little bit. I hate that because of what he means to us but EJ, oh boy, I'm glad he's on our team." "E.J. is special."

The two schools had met 18 prior times with Florida State holding a commanding 15–3 advantage in the series. The last meeting was a 38-10 FSU victory in 1991. This was the first time the programs had met in a bowl game.

References

Chick-fil-A Bowl
Peach Bowl
Florida State Seminoles football bowl games
South Carolina Gamecocks football bowl games
Chick-fil-A Bowl
Chick-fil-A Bowl
Chick-fil-A Bowl